Teja Töpfer is a German lightweight rower. He won a gold medal at the 1996 World Rowing Championships in Motherwell with the lightweight men's eight.

References

Year of birth missing (living people)
German male rowers
World Rowing Championships medalists for Germany
Living people